Mordvinovo is a rural locality (a village) in Posyolok Velikodvorsky, Gus-Khrustalny District, Vladimir Oblast, Russia. The population was 1 as of 2010.

Geography 
Mordvinovo is located on the Dandur River, 56 km south of Gus-Khrustalny (the district's administrative centre) by road. Kharlamovo is the nearest rural locality.

References 

Rural localities in Gus-Khrustalny District